Beardy's and Okemasis' Cree Nation is a Cree First Nations band government in Saskatchewan, Canada. Their reserves include:

 Beardy's & Okemasis' 96 & 97
 Beardy's & Okemasis' 96 & 97A
 Beardy's & Okemasis' 96 & 97B
 Beardy's & Okemasis' 96 & 97C

History & Etymology

The nation is named for Willow Cree Chiefs Beardy (kâmiyescawesit (Kah-mis-cho-wey-sit), "one who has a little beard") and Okemasis (okimâsis, "little chief", diminutive of okimâw). Together, they led two-thirds of the Willow Cree band and settled west of Duck Lake prior to the signing of Treaty 6 in 1876. With adjoining reserves, the two bands have since merged into a single First Nation. The Cree name for this combined reserve is ᓃᐱᓰᐦᑯᐹᐏᔨᓃᓈᕽ nîpisîhkopâwiyinînâhk, "among the Willow Cree".

The remaining Willow Cree today form the One Arrow First Nation.

The Willow Cree are a sub-group of the Plains Cree tribe located today in the geographic regions of the Saskatchewan parklands, situated on the southern edge of the Boreal Forest and northern edge of the Great Plains, also situated between the North Saskatchewan and South Saskatchewan Rivers.

References

External links

First Nations in Saskatchewan
Cree governments